Lentzea aerocolonigenes is a bacterium from the genus Lentzea which has been isolated from soil in Japan. Lentzea aerocolonigenes produces rebeccamycin.

References

Pseudonocardiales
Bacteria described in 1986